is in Tokyo and Yamanashi Prefectures in Japan. Lying above the Ogōchi Dam, it is also known as the Ogōchi Reservoir. Lake Okutama is an important source of drinking water for Tokyo.

Description
The lake occupies part of the town of Okutama in Nishitama District, Tokyo and the village of Tabayama in Kitatsuru District, Yamanashi.

The Taba (Tama) River feeds Lake Okutama at its western end. From the southwest, the Kosuge River also flows into the lake. The Tama River drains the lake at the eastern end. The surroundings are famous for cherry blossoms in the spring.

Ogōchi Dam
 Dam height: 148 m
 Dam length: 353 m
 Greatest depth: 142 m
 Mean depth: 43.6 m
 Circumference when full: 45.37 km
 Altitude of surface when full: 526.5 m
 Area of surface when full: 4.25 km²
 Capacity: 185,400,000 m³
 Completion: 1957
 Displaced: 945 households
 Died during construction: 87 people

Notes

External links

Tokyo Metropolitan Government Bureau of Waterworks
Japan National Tourism Organization
Go Tokyo, Official Tokyo Travel Guide

Landforms of Tokyo
Reservoirs in Japan
Western Tokyo
Landforms of Yamanashi Prefecture